Ascaltis is a genus of sponges in the family Leucascidae, first described in 1872 by Ernst Haeckel.

Species
According to WORMS, accepted species in the genus are:
Ascaltis abyssus Rapp, Janussen & Tendal, 2011
Ascaltis agassizii Haeckel, 1872
Ascaltis angusta Van Soest & De Voogd, 2015
Ascaltis cavata (Carter, 1886)
Ascaltis depressa (Dendy, 1891)
Ascaltis gardineri (Dendy, 1913)
Ascaltis grisea (Dendy & Frederick, 1924)
Ascaltis lamarcki (Haeckel, 1870)
Ascaltis panis (Haeckel, 1870)
Ascaltis pelliculata (Dendy, 1891)
Ascaltis poterium (Haeckel, 1872)
Ascaltis reticulum (Schmidt, 1862)
Ascaltis vitraea (Row & Hôzawa, 1931)
Ascaltis wilsoni (Dendy, 1891)

References

Taxa named by Ernst Haeckel